Subway Art is a collaborative book by Martha Cooper and Henry Chalfant, which documents the early history of the New York City graffiti movement. Originally published in 1984, the book has been described as a "landmark photographic history". Known by many as ‘the bible’ of graffiti, Subway Art quickly acquired the dubious accolade of becoming one of the most stolen books in the United Kingdom.

The title is a reference to the New York City Subway, where much of the city's graffiti was set during the late 20th century. The book features artists such as Zephyr, Seen, Kase2, Dondi, and Lady Pink.

The 25th anniversary edition was released in 2009, available in large print measuring 43x30.5 cm.

References

Graffiti in the United States
Hip hop books
Culture of New York City
Works set on the New York City Subway
Street culture
Books of photographs
1984 non-fiction books
Collaborative non-fiction books